This is a list of seasons completed by the Minnesota Twins, originally known as the Washington Senators, a professional baseball franchise based in Minneapolis, Minnesota; they currently play in the American League (AL) Central division.

The Minnesota Twins franchise has won three World Series in 1924, 1987 and 1991, the first of which occurred when the team was in Washington D.C. As the Senators, the team were annual doormats for the AL except 1924-1933 when the team played in three World Series (winning one). The team enjoyed success in their early years in Minnesota, reaching the World Series in 1965 and playing in two American League Championship Series with stars (and future Hall of Famers) like Harmon Killebrew, Rod Carew, Tony Oliva, and Jim Kaat on the roster. From 1971 to 1986, the Twins failed to reach the postseason as their stars either retired, were traded, or fled via Free Agency. The Twins had eight straight losing seasons from 1993 to 2000 and the team was a frequent target for rumored MLB contraction, but this was followed by one of the franchise's most consistent periods of success when the team only had one losing season (2007) between 2001 and 2010. Despite the team's success during this period, the Twins failed to reach another World Series. The team has been up and down since 2010, epitomized with the franchise losing 103 games in 2016 and winning 101 games (and reaching the playoffs) in 2019.

Regular season record-by-year

Record by decade 
The following table describes the Twins' MLB win–loss record by decade.

These statistics are from Baseball-Reference.com's Minnesota Twins History & Encyclopedia, and are current as of the 2022 Major League Baseball season.

Postseason record by year
The Twins have made the postseason seventeen times in their history, with their first being in 1924 and the most recent being in 2020.

References

External links
 Twins Year-By-Year Results at MLB.com
 Twins Postseason Results at MLB.com

Minnesota Twins
Seasons